Ghar Waapsi is an Indian Hindi-Language family drama television series created by Dice Media  and directed by Ruchir Arun.

'Ghar Waapsi' revolves around Shekhar (Vishal Vashishtha), who returns to his hometown of Indore after he is fired from his job in Bengaluru. However, he decides to keep it a secret from his family. His life changes forever as he finds a road to self-discovery.

Cast
Vishal Vashishtha as Shekhar Dwivedi
Atul Shrivastava as Shekhar's father, Ratan Lal Dwivedi
Vibha Chibber as Shekhar's mother, Madhuvanti Dwivedi 
Saad Bilgrami as Shekhar's younger brother, Sanju Dwivedi
Anushka Kaushik as Shekhar's younger sister, Suruchi Dwivedi
Ajitesh Gupta as Shekhar's friend, Darshan Bafna
Gyanendra Tripathi as cafe owner and Shekhar's mentor, Manish
Akanksha Thakur  as Shekhar's love interest, Riddhima

Episodes

Season 1 (2022)

Reception

Critical response 
Pratik Sur from Outlook India said, “The emotional connection that ‘Ghar Waapsi’ manages to bring forth is fantastic. It's this relatability in every young adult's life that audiences would be able to relate to. Leaving aside the technical glitches in the timelines, this Vishal Vashishtha show is definitely a Breezy Weekend Watch. I am going with 3.5 stars.”
Arushi Jain from Indian Express said, “It is a show that will bring you home or will make you take a break from your humdrum work schedule and sit with your parents and siblings for a little gupshup or maybe a game of Ludo.”

Sreeju Sudhakaran from Latestly said, “There are certain movies and show where you start watching as an evaluator but end up being their joyful, smitten fan, looking desperate for the next person to share your opinion on the same.

Grace Cyril of India Today stated, "The performances in the series are all noteworthy" and "Ghar Waapsi's relatability in today’s times is what will touch your hearts.".

References

External links 
 
 Ghar Waapsi at Hotstar

2022 Indian television series debuts
Indian drama television series